is a Japanese anime television series. It is based on an original dōjinshi manga series by Yoshitoshi ABe, which was released from 1998 to 2002 and left unfinished as work on the anime began. The 13-episode series was animated by Radix and broadcast on Fuji TV between October and December 2002. It was also broadcast on Animax Asia in English and French under the title Ailes Grises (Grey Wings).

Plot
The series begins with two parallel scenes. The first scene is of a girl falling through the sky, head downward and cradling a crow. The crow tries to stop the girl's fall by pulling on the hem of her robe, but cannot and eventually flies away. The other scene is of a group of female Haibane who find a large cocoon growing in a storage room. The Haibane clean the room to prepare for the opening of the cocoon. When the cocoon breaks open, the girl inside (the one seen falling in the first scene) is brought to a guest room where several Haibane care for her, led by an older Haibane named Reki ("small stones"). When the girl wakes up, she can remember only the part of her cocoon dream in which she was falling. As Haibane are traditionally named based on their dreams in the cocoon, she is named Rakka ("falling"). Shortly after arriving, the Haibane present Rakka with a halo which she begins to wear. Reki cares for Rakka as she goes through the painful and bloody ordeal of having wings erupt from her back. Reki and the other Haibane—who are all teenage girls and younger children—live in "Old Home," an abandoned school in the country near the town of Glie. As time passes, Rakka learns more about Old Home and the Haibane who live there; about Glie, in which the townspeople are friendly and generous to the Haibane; and about "Abandoned Factory," where a second co-ed group of Haibane lives. The very young children among the Haibane at both locations live at Old Home and are in the care of Reki and a "house mother" from town.

All Haibane must work at jobs in Glie and are subject to restrictive rules with sometimes harsh penalties. Foremost among these rules: Haibane may not own anything new, may not use money, and are forbidden to touch or even approach the wall that circles Glie. These rules are strictly enforced by the Haibane Renmei ("Charcoal Feather Federation"), an organization that oversees the lives of the Haibane. Rakka quickly bonds with the other residents of Old Home — especially Reki and Kuu — and begins searching for a job by spending a day with each of her friends at their jobs in a bakery, in the library, in the clock repair center at the clock tower, and taking care of the children at Old Home. As the winter approaches, Kuu becomes pensive and distracted and begins to give away her possessions. One day, Kuu vanishes. Rakka is distraught when she learns that Kuu has taken her Day of Flight, has passed over the wall, and will never return. The Day of Flight is the eventual fate of all Haibane who are not "sin-bound."

Characters

  
A new arrival at Old Home, Rakka struggles throughout the series to "find herself," and has trouble escaping from curiosity about her past. She forms many friendships, but her closest is with Reki. It is implied that she died in the fall that features in her cocoon dream. Someone precious to her (represented by a crow throughout the narrative) tried to save her, but failed, and was hurt by the event. Rakka is very quiet and a bit on the withdrawn side. She spends a lot of time pondering her previous existence and the mysteries of what lies beyond the Walls, as well as the origin of the Haibane.

  
Reki is a mother figure to the other Haibane of Old Home. Reki cannot remember her "cocoon dream," is troubled by her past at Old Home and by vivid and horrible nightmares, which she then paints as a way of trying to figure them out. She has been a Haibane for seven years, longer than the others except for Nemu. She spends her time taking care of the precocious pack of Young Feathers who clearly drive her crazy but whom she seems to love unconditionally.

  
The youngest of the "older" Haibane and the first to take her Day of Flight. Kuu overcame her initial awkwardness to achieve a sense of peace. She develops a close friendship with Rakka and has been a Haibane for two years. Outgoing and a bit hyper, Kuu demonstrates surprising knowledge of the town and serves as a good role model for Rakka.

  
The Haibane who has lived longest at Old Home. Her friends tease Nemu because she is always sleeping. In fact, her cocoon dream was of herself, sleeping, which is a bit of an inside gag at Old Home. She is an old friend of Reki, works at the library, and has been a Haibane for nine years. Nemu is often the voice of reason and calm during times of trouble and, like Reki, holds back the secret of a troubled past. She seems to have an almost mother/daughter relationship with Sumika, the former senior librarian.

  
A mechanically inclined tomboy, Kana works at the clock tower in the center of town. Kana has been a Haibane for three years. Kana has a bit of a whimsical side to her as she reveals to Rakka that she wonders about the world outside the walls as well. More often than not though, Kana is hyper and obnoxious, which helps her to coexist with her grouchy master at the clock tower. Despite her confident attitude, Kana is actually very sensitive deep down and cares deeply for her friends, showing almost as much sadness as Rakka for Kuu's loss before grudgingly accepting it.

  
A serious, but occasionally mischievous and funny, Haibane. She works in a bakery in town and has been a Haibane for four years. Hikari has a tendency to be a bit forgetful, such as forgetting to tell Rakka to practice moving her wings before her trip to the Haibane Renmei Temple. She's highly innovative, experimenting at the bakery with the halo mold presumably a short time after Rakka was born.

  
Prominent member of the second, co-ed group of Haibane in Glie who live at the Abandoned Factory "nest" on the opposite side of town from Old Home. Was a friend of Reki in the past. Upon first meeting Rakka, he accidentally upsets her with a remark about Kuu's recent Day of Flight. Despite his tough exterior, he's shown to be very kind, such as sending Rakka pastries and an apology note for the incident.

  
A Haibane from Abandoned Factory and a close friend of Hyōko. Has an ongoing grudge against Reki for her past endangerment of Hyōko but is willing to talk with Rakka and others.

  
 A presiding official of the Haibane Renmei who gives spiritual advice and worldly assistance and, occasionally, imposes punishments on Haibane who break the rules. The Communicator is the only person who can speak with the Toga on their visits to the town and it's speculated that he himself was a failed Haibane. He wishes for the Day of Flight to come to all the Haibane successfully and feels concerned that Reki refuses to heed his advice and attempts to help her.

  
 A Haibane who cared for the young Nemu and Reki. Despite her delicate health, she was kind and helpful to them, especially to Reki in dealing with her black wings. Kuramori took her Day of Flight five years before the start of the series but remains vivid in the memories of Reki and Nemu, the only ones remaining to remember her. She's the only full-grown adult Haibane to be shown, as all the others are teens and mid-adolescents.

The Toga are the only people who can enter and leave the city of Glie at will. The Toga never speak, save for communicating in sign language to the Communicator (who represents the link between the citizens of Glie and the Haibane Renmei), and they never reveal their faces. Human and Haibane alike are told to keep their distance from the Toga.

  
A librarian, senior of Namu. When Rakka first worked at the library, she planned to left work 4 days afterwards for maternity leave. However, she remained in library during winter.

Young Feathers
Unlike the senior counterparts, theirs names are chosen based on aspirations.
  
A haibane who was originally from Abandoned Factory, but lives in Old Home most of the time.

  

  
A haibane who taught Rakka how to move wings.

Haibane

Upon emerging from the cocoons in which they first appear in the world, Haibane appear to be normal human beings. Shortly afterwards, Haibane painfully grow feathered wings from their backs, and are given halos specially forged for them by the Haibane Renmei, which may take a few days to float properly over their heads. They always have a sense that they used to live in another place and were someone else, but they cannot remember where or who they were. Haibane are generally children or teenagers when they come into the world; adult Haibane are not shown or mentioned in the series, except for Kuramori.

Healthy Haibane wings are charcoal grey and are too small to be functional. Although with wings and halos Haibane resemble the angels of traditional Christianity, creator Yoshitoshi ABe has said that this resemblance is not significant but is purely an aesthetic choice.

Haibane cocoons grow from small seeds like dandelion tufts that fall from the sky and land in places such as Old Home, usually depicted in the spring and always in indoor, uninhabited rooms. Once landed, these seeds dig into the floor and grow quickly to a very large size, bigger than a person, but somewhat dependent on the size of the person inside. Roots grow out of the cocoon into the surrounding surfaces to support it.

Inside, each new Haibane experiences a vivid dream, and then wakes up suspended within the cocoon. They are dressed in a plain white robe, surrounded by some sort of breathable liquid, and able to hear sound from outside. The walls are easily pulled apart, and each Haibane must dig their way out. According to Reki, tradition holds that if hatchlings cannot break free themselves, they will not grow strong, much like birds or butterflies.

Once awake in their new world, known as the little town of Glie (they may sleep for some time after hatching), each Haibane is given a new name according to the dream they had while in the cocoon. They are all sure that they had a name and life prior to this one, but none are ever able to remember any details, and it is thought that even if they met their families, they would not recognize one another. Certain traces of emotion remain, however, and they remember practical things like how to talk or ride a bicycle. Some Haibane, born as young children, choose their own names based on dreams for the future, presumably ignoring the ones given to them at hatching.

After a Haibane has received a name, they are given a halo which floats over their head, "to be a guide for the future." The connection may be tenuous at first, but once the halo "sticks," it is almost like a part of the Haibane's body and can be used to drag them about or to support the weight of other objects. These halos glow brightly, and in the dōjinshi they spin rapidly as well. It is later revealed that they are forged from metallic flakes, called , which can be found in tunnels in the wall that surrounds the city.

Wings are formed within the Haibane's body, first appearing as uncomfortable lumps on the back. Within a day or two of the hatching, these grow rapidly and put the Haibane into a state of fever, finally bursting through the skin in a painful and bloody manner. The pain and fever last for about a day before rapidly and completely subsiding. Meanwhile, the feathers of the wings must be cleaned, or else the blood and other fluids will stain them. Thorough cleaning can be a long procedure and must be done by someone else, as the newly born Haibane is too weak and in too much pain. Once Haibane recover their health after this ordeal, they start to be able to move the wings, although it takes some time to gain complete control over them. After a week or more of involuntary twitching and quick exhaustion, each Haibane finally learns to control the wings like any other part of their body.

The Haibane in general are bound by certain rules set forth by the Haibane Renmei. They are allowed possessions they make themselves, or which the townsfolk have cast aside, and thus must wear used clothing and make use of discarded or donated items. Their "nests" (where they first appear and thereafter live) are always long-abandoned buildings (the two seen are Old Home—a dormitory—and Abandoned Factory). They are only allowed to work in the oldest buildings and obtain groceries from the oldest shops. They are not allowed to handle money. Instead, they are each given a notebook by the Haibane Renmei, the pages of which they use as scrip to pay for food and used goods. They are not allowed to linger near or touch the city walls.

Haibane's lives are eventually drawn toward their , or in the English-language versions, "Day of Flight." This day approaches when the Haibane in question has overcome certain internal trials and is ready to move on. Their halo begins to flicker and dim. Finally they depart, alone and unannounced, for an ancient ruin in the Western Woods, where they pass over the city walls in a beam of light. Their halo is left behind on the ground and no longer glows. The other characters experience this much as they would an ordinary death—no one knows when it will happen, or what lies beyond the wall, and those left behind feel the loss of separation. Nevertheless, Leaving the Nest has a positive connotation, and most of the Haibane believe that life beyond the walls is somehow higher or better than life in Glie, and that friends can reunite there. It's later revealed that this passage is not certain and has a deadline; the flickering of the halo serves as warning that the moment of truth approaches. If a Haibane fails to overcome their trials by then, they "fall" instead. The Haibane loses their wings and halo and is forced to grow old and die in isolation.

Sin-bound Haibane
Some Haibane do not remember their  properly and are called . These Haibane can be recognized by the black stains that appear on their wings. Fans conjecture that these Haibane committed suicide in their past lives; this would appear to be the case with Reki, as her cocoon dream seems to indicate this. Also supporting this theory is the observation that Rakka, whose name means falling, had a fear of heights. ABe encourages fans to reach their own conclusions. Signs of being sin-bound do not always appear from birth. For example, Rakka's wings became discolored only after her close friend Kuu had taken her Day of Flight and gone over the walls. She managed to restore her wings with the help of a crow that had been following her since she arrived. It's speculated that the crow is the reincarnated form of someone close to her from her previous life.

Sin-bound Haibane cannot achieve their "Day of Flight" until they are no longer sin-bound. If they remain sin-bound after a certain amount of time, they cease to be Haibane. The Communicator tells Rakka that these Haibane lose their wings and halos, and are required to live apart from humans and Haibane. (The viewpoint at this moment shifts to the false wings that are a part of the Communicator's uniform and the emblem on his hood resembling a halo, perhaps as a hint that the members of the Haibane Renmei are these "fallen Haibane." It is possible that the Toga, the only people who can enter and leave the city of Glie, originate as fallen Haibane.) Despite this, Reki believed that when her time as a Haibane was over, she would simply vanish if she were still sin-bound. The Communicator tells Reki "You know what happens to a Haibane whose time expires before she becomes ready to take the Flight". This could mean that Reki has seen other sin-bound Haibane expire prematurely before.

The Haibane Renmei, however, may in time give the Haibane a new name (with the same onji) that is symbolic of their spiritual fate or the obstacles they have overcome. In Rakka's case, the Communicator notes that she had shed the feelings of abandonment and isolation of her previous life and bonded gregariously with others; he thus gives her the name . With Reki, the Communicator foresees a tragic fate and gives her the name , should she fail to escape it. If she overcomes her failures, she can remain  and be a stepping stone in a path for others to follow.

Sin-bound Haibane usually feel guilty about something they have done in their previous life and, until they can overcome this, they cannot become a normal Haibane. The theory that Haibane, in general, are reincarnations of humans in a previous life is supported by clues in Reki's dream. In her dream, Reki steps in front of a moving train and presumably kills herself. Rakka is helped by a bird whom she believes to represent someone she knew in her previous life. The idea behind the Sin-Bound is that no one can forgive themselves for their past transgressions; they must learn to be forgiven by another.

Media

Dōjinshi
The very first version of Haibane Renmei was a short dōjinshi of the same title by Yoshitoshi ABe. Released in 1998, it bore little resemblance to the final anime aside from being about people with halos and grey wings.

ABe later reworked his idea into The Haibane of Old Home, with completely new characters and a different plot. The first issue, released in late 2001, was some 24 pages long and ends roughly two-thirds of the way through the story covered by the first anime episode. The second issue covers the end of the first episode and about a third of the second episode.

ABe next released two special dōjinshi: the "Lifestyle Diary" and the "Extra Edition". The former explains that the story has been licensed as an anime to be released later that year, and so he will not be continuing the dōjinshi. The book's contents cover the specifics of character design, from personality to shoe-style, and lay out maps of the town and some of its buildings. It features several four-panel comics depicting the lives and behaviors of the specific Haibane, and the protagonist Rakka's curiosity about her halo and wings. The Extra Edition is a flashback story to the character Reki's experiences as a girl shortly after her mentor, Kuramori, left their home. This part of the story is covered in the anime, but the dōjinshi adds some additional detail. It was released after the completion of the anime series.

Anime

The anime series aired in Japan in late 2002 and was released on DVD the following year. It was subsequently aired by Animax in its respective networks around the world, translating and subtitling the series into English for broadcast across its English language networks in Southeast Asia under the French title Ailes Grises (Grey Wings), where the series received its English-language television premiere. It was licensed and dubbed into English, in North America by Geneon Entertainment and New Generation Pictures, which published DVD releases from mid-2003 to early 2004. In 2010 Funimation (now Crunchyroll, LLC) relicensed the show, along with a handful of other Geneon properties. It has been released in Australia by Madman Entertainment and in Europe by MVM Films. Funimation later released a Blu-ray version on November 23, 2021. 

A comic based on the television series was published by Dark Horse Comics in 2006-04-26.

Notes

References

Bibliography

External links

NBCUniversal Entertainment Japan page
Pioneer/Geneon Entertainment Inc. pages: English, Japan 
Funimation Haibane Renmei page
Haibane Renmei soundtrack review by Jonathan Mays

ANN review

2002 anime television series debuts
Doujinshi
Existentialist anime and manga
Fantasy anime and manga
Funimation
Geneon USA
NBCUniversal Entertainment Japan